Zacharias Calliergi was a Greek Renaissance humanist and scholar. 

He was born in Crete, then a Venetian colony, but emigrated to Rome at a young age. In 1499 he helped bring out the Etymologicum Magnum in Venice and in 1515 he set up a printing press where he published exclusively Greek volumes, among them the first Greek book printed in Rome, Pindar's Epinikion ("Victory Odes").

In 1499, he established himself in Venice, along with Nicolaos Vlastos, also a Cretan, the first Greek-owned printing press. Their publishing production wasn’t restricted only to the Greek public but generally to the humanistic public of their era. Also the financial support by Anna Notaras contributed to the 'imperial decoration' of the publications. 
 
The printery was exclusively staffed by Cretans, both in technicians and in individuals who shouldered the literary responsibilities of the publications. The offspring of this Cretan collaboration were four archetypes: the Etymologicum Magnum, one of the most important Byzantine dictionaries, the Ypomnema eis tas dekas kategorias tou Aristotelous, the Ypomnema eis tas pente phonas Porphyriou, tou Ammoniou and the Therapeutica of Galen.

The publications are characterized by Byzantine luster, enriched by the expanded use of red-types, and aesthetic titles, and different sized first letters. 
  
His edition of the Etymologicum Magnum is one of the most important monuments of Byzantine literature. The beauty of this book comes from the tasteful aesthetics of the letters, which characterize the Byzantine, especially the liturgical Byzantine book. The pages are illustrated by xylography, in the top of each chapter.

Known works
Etymologicum Magnum, extensive Greek etymological dictionary, 1499
Ypomnema eis tas deka kategorias tou Aristotelous, ("Memorandum to the ten categories of Aristotle"), 1499
Agapetou diakonou parainetika kephalaia pros Ioustinianon, ("Deacon Agapetos’ exhortative chapters to Justinian"), 1509
Thoma tou Magistrou, kat’alphabeton Attidos dialektou ekloga, eis oi dokimotatoi orontai ton palaion, kai tines autis parasemeioseis kai diaphorai, 1515
The victory odes of Pindar, including the editio princeps of the scholia, 1515
Theokriton, 1516
Apophthegmata philosophon, syllechthenta ypo Arseniou Monemvasias ("Sayings of philosophers, collected by Arsenios of Monemvasia"), 1515
Mega kai pany ophelimon lexicon, oper Garinos o Favorinos Kamirs o Nikairias episkopos ek pollon kai diaphoron biblion kata stoicheion synelexanto, 1523

References

See also
Greek scholars in the Renaissance

15th-century births
15th-century Greek people
15th-century Italian businesspeople
15th-century printers
15th-century Venetian people
16th-century deaths
16th-century Greek people
16th-century Italian businesspeople
16th-century printers
16th-century Venetian people
Greek Renaissance humanists
Zacharias
People from Rethymno
Scholars from Crete
15th-century Greek educators
16th-century Greek educators